Khetpartug (khət paṛtūg) khat partoog, is a type of Pashtun clothing worn in Afghanistan.

Origin 
Khetpartug originated in Afghanistan.

Design

Khet
The khet is the upper garment which is loose and slightly tightened at the waist and is more like a tunic or a robe, similar to a smock with wide sleeves and reach below the knees. The khet does not traditionally have side slits, and is worn with a belt at the waist.

Partug
The partug is the lower garment which is very loose and full of pleats, with folds all around the waist and made of yards of material. Khet partug is also similar to the costume worn by men dancing the attan.

Photo gallery

See also
 Afghan clothing
 Pashtun clothing

References

Afghan clothing
Pashtun culture

Pakistani clothing